Botbot may refer to:

 Botbot, a barangay in the municipality of Hamtic, Antique province, Philippines
 Botbot, a barangay in the municipality of Pandan, Antique province, Philippines
 A dialect of Mbore language
 The robots in the animated series Transformers: BotBots